Prof. Volodymyr Melnyk (born 25 November 1952 in Plyskiv) is a Ukrainian scientist, Doctor of Philosophy and current rector of the Lviv University (elected in 2014).

He graduated from Lviv Polytechnic. Between 1996 and 2014 he was decan of Faculty of Philosophy in Lviv University.

References

External links
 Biography

1952 births
Living people
People from Vinnytsia Oblast
Ukrainian philosophers
Lviv Polytechnic alumni
University of Lviv rectors